John Scott (9 November 1923 – 11 November 2008) was a British television weatherman who appeared for the BBC, ITV and Channel 4 during a 20-year broadcasting career.

Early life
He attended Spennymoor Grammar School in Spennymoor. He went to Nottingham Technical College (which eventually became Nottingham Trent University), leaving in 1941. In 1941, aged 17, Scott joined the Met Office, later joining the Royal Air Force and serving in Sullom Voe, Malta and North Africa during and after World War II. In the 1950s and 1960s he worked at RAF Watnall (now called the Nottingham Weather Centre), and in Nairobi, Kenya, and at RAF Uxbridge.

Broadcasting
Jack Scott made his television debut in May 1969 as the BBC's twentieth weather forecaster; he stayed with them until his retirement in 1983. As Scott was employed by the Civil Service rather than the BBC, when he left the BBC and the Met Office in 1983 aged 60, he was able to draw a Civil Service pension. He went on to work for the ITV company Thames Television (1983 – 1988) and was a presenter of Channel 4's magazine programme for the over 60s, Years Ahead, from 1988 to 1989. He also made regular appearances on Pebble Mill at One discussing weather-related topics and presented a series called Under the Weather.

Described by the BBC as a "pioneer", Scott introduced the famous magnetic symbols to viewers in 1975, which could sometimes slip or fall off during broadcasts. He also helped lay the foundations of the computerised system of forecasting used today. Mark Byford, the BBC's Deputy Director-General, praised Scott's "wonderful gift of authority and knowledge matched by a warm and accessible style."

Personal life
Scott was married to Marrion (who died in 2000) and had two sons, David (who survived him) and Jonathan, who died in a climbing accident in the Himalayas.
Jack was a member of Burnham Beeches Golf Club in Buckinghamshire. He lived in Iver Heath, in the former South Bucks district.

He died of cancer aged 85 on 11 November 2008.

References

External links
 Telegraph obituary
 Scott on the BBC website
 BBC obituaries 

1923 births
2008 deaths
Alumni of Nottingham Trent University
Royal Air Force personnel of World War II
BBC weather forecasters
English meteorologists
English television presenters
People from South Bucks District
People from Spennymoor
Deaths from cancer in England
People educated at Spennymoor Grammar School